Vucub-Came is one of the "Brass Knuckles", a series of equatorial dark regions on Pluto. It is named after Wuquub' Kameh  "Seven Death", one of the Quiché death gods in the Popol Vuh.

Vucub-Came Macula is the fourth-largest dark spot on Pluto. Its surface is covered with tholins which give Vucub-Came its brown color. The dark spot is surrounded with tall uplands. Extensive fault systems in this area have formed deep canyons running roughly north–south.

References

Regions of Pluto